This is a list of episodes of the animated TV series Everything's Rosie.

Series overview

Episodes

Pilot (2008)

Series 1 (2010)

Series 2 (2011)

Series 3 (2012–2013)

Special (2014)

Series 4 (2015–2017)

References

External links 
 

Everything's Rosie
Everything's Rosie